Miggs Cuaderno (born August 8, 2004) is a Filipino actor and model. He is a recipient of several accolades including his best actor in Chéries Chéris Film Festival Paris, Famas Awards Movie Child Performer of the Year And the First Child Actor to be awarded A Balanghai Trophy for Best Supporting Actor on Cinemalaya X 2014 and known in the Philippines as a TV host in GMA's Tropang Potchi and as an actor in GMA television series, Ang Munting Heredera as Ton Ton, Second Chances, which stars Jennylyn Mercado, Raymart Santiago, Camille Prats, and Rafael Rosell. He was also known for Poor Señorita as Apol, Prima Donnas as Coco, Destiny Rose as Young Joey, Quick Change and Asintado.

In the Chéries-Chéris International Film Festival in France, Miggs Cuaderno won a best actor award in a Cinemalaya film, Quick Changes.

Filmography

TV Shows

Movies

Awards

References

External links
 

2004 births
Living people
Filipino male television actors
Filipino male child actors
GMA Network personalities
Filipino male film actors
Tagalog people